This is a list of earthquakes in 1934. Only magnitude 6.0 or greater earthquakes appear on the list. Lower magnitude events are included if they have caused death, injury or damage. Events which occurred in remote areas will be excluded from the list as they wouldn't have generated significant media interest. All dates are listed according to UTC time. The largest and deadliest event was the great earthquake which struck Nepal in January. In that magnitude 8.0 quake, 12,000 people died. Other parts of the world saw much activity with the Philippines, the Solomon Islands, Dutch East Indies and  New Guinea seeing much instability. Apart from the devastating Nepal earthquake, no other event caused more than 10 deaths which is unusual for any year.

Overall

By death toll 

 Note: At least 10 casualties

By magnitude 

 Note: At least 7.0 magnitude

Notable events

January

February

March

April

May

June

July

August

September

October

November

December

References

1934
 
1934